The Barton Historic District is a historic district in West Bend, Wisconsin.

Now engulfed by West Bend, the modest former village of Barton retains survivors from its early frontier days. Includes the 1850 gabled-ell Hays-Raif house, the 1865 Barton Roller Mill, the 1865 Frazer General Store, the 1865 Greek Revival Frazer House, the 1900 Gothic Revival St Mary's church,  the 1915 Barton Bank, the 1921 Ustruck bungalow, and the 1928 French Revival Kircher house.

References 

National Register of Historic Places in Washington County, Wisconsin